Robert Sauer may refer to:
 Robert Sauer (mathematician), German mathematician
 Robert T. Sauer, American biochemist